This is the discography for American jazz musician Charlie Haden.

As leader/co-leader 

 Closeness (Duets with Ornette Coleman, Keith Jarrett, Alice Coltrane and Paul Motian) (Horizon, 1976)
 As Long as There's Music with Hampton Hawes (Artists House, 1978)
 The Golden Number (Horizon, 1977)
 Soapsuds, Soapsuds with Ornette Coleman (Artists House, 1977)
 Gitane with Christian Escoudé (All Life, 1979)
 Mágico with Jan Garbarek and Egberto Gismonti (ECM, 1980)
 Folk Songs with Jan Garbarek and Egberto Gismonti (ECM, 1981)
 Time Remembers One Time Once with Denny Zeitlin (ECM, 1983)
 Mágico: Carta de Amor with Jan Garbarek and Egberto Gismonti (ECM, 2012)
 Etudes with Geri Allen and Paul Motian (Soul Note, 1988)
 Silence with Chet Baker, Enrico Pieranunzi and Billy Higgins (Soul Note, 1989)
 Helium Tears with Ralph Towner, Jerry Granelli, and Robben Ford (NewEdition, 2005)
 The Montreal Tapes: with Don Cherry and Ed Blackwell (Verve, 1994)
 The Montreal Tapes: with Paul Bley and Paul Motian (Verve, 1994)
 The Montreal Tapes: with Geri Allen and Paul Motian (Verve, 1997)
 The Montreal Tapes: with Gonzalo Rubalcaba and Paul Motian (Verve, 1997)
 The Montreal Tapes: Tribute to Joe Henderson (Verve, 2003)
 In Montreal with Egberto Gismonti (ECM, 2001)
 First Song with Enrico Pieranunzi and Billy Higgins (Soul Note, 1992)
 Dialogues with Carlos Paredes (Antilles, 1990)
 Charlie Haden/Jim Hall with Jim Hall (Impulse!, 2014)
 Steal Away with Hank Jones (Verve, 1995)
 Night and the City with Kenny Barron (Verve, 1998)
 Beyond the Missouri Sky (Short Stories) with Pat Metheny (Verve, 1997)
 None But the Lonely Heart with Chris Anderson (Naim, 1997)
 Nocturne with Gonzalo Rubalcaba (Verve, 2001)
 American Dreams with Michael Brecker (Verve, 2002)
 Nightfall with John Taylor (Naim, 2004)
 Land of the Sun with Gonzalo Rubalcaba (Verve, 2004)
 Heartplay with Antonio Forcione (Naim, 2006)
 Rambling Boy (EmArcy, 2008)
 Come Sunday with Hank Jones (EmArcy, 2012)
Posthumous releases
 Tokyo Adagio with Gonzalo Rubalcaba (Impulse!, 2015) – recorded in 2005
 Long Ago and Far Away with Brad Mehldau (Impulse!, 2018) – recorded in 2007
 Live At The Village Vanguard - Unissued Tracks with Geri Allen, Paul Motian (Somethin' Cool, 2022) – live recorded in 1990

As leader of the Liberation Music Orchestra
 Liberation Music Orchestra (Impulse!, 1970)
 The Ballad of the Fallen (ECM, 1983)
 The Montreal Tapes: Liberation Music Orchestra (Verve, 1999)
 Dream Keeper (Blue Note, 1990)
 Not in Our Name (Verve, 2005)
 Time/Life (Impulse!, 2016)

As leader of Quartet West
 Quartet West (Verve, 1987)
 In Angel City (Verve, 1988)
 Haunted Heart (Verve, 1992)
 Always Say Goodbye (Verve, 1994)
 Now Is the Hour (Verve, 1996)
 The Art of the Song (Verve, 1999)
 The Private Collection (Naim, 2007) – live
 2010: Sophisticated Ladies with Diana Krall, Melody Gardot, Norah Jones, Cassandra Wilson, Renée Fleming and Ruth Cameron (EmArcy, 2010)

As member 
Old and New Dreams
 Old and New Dreams (Black Saint, 1977)
 Old and New Dreams (ECM, 1979)
 Playing (ECM, 1981) – live
 A Tribute to Blackwell (Black Saint, 1990) – live

As sideman 
With Geri Allen and Paul Motian
 In the Year of the Dragon (JMT, 1989)
 Segments (DIW, 1989)
 Live at the Village Vanguard (DIW, 1991) – live rec. 1990

With Ginger Baker and Bill Frisell
 Going Back Home (Atlantic, 1994)
 Falling Off the Roof (Atlantic, 1996)

With Carla Bley
 Escalator over the Hill (JCOA, 1971)
 Musique Mecanique (Watt, 1979)

With Paul Bley
 Solemn Meditation (GNP Crescendo, 1958)
 Live at the Hilcrest Club 1958 (Inner City, 1976)
 Coleman Classics Volume 1 (Improvising Artists, 1977)
 Memoirs (Soul Note, 1990)

With Michael Brecker
 Michael Brecker (Impulse!, 1987)
 Don't Try This at Home (Impulse!, 1988)
 Nearness of You: The Ballad Book (Verve, 2001) – rec. 2000

With Ruth Cameron
 First Songs (Polygram, 1999)
 Roadhouse (Verve, 2000)

With Don Cherry
 Relativity Suite (JCOA, 1973)
 Brown Rice (EMI, 1975)
 Art Deco (A&M, 1989) – rec. 1988

With Ornette Coleman
 The Shape of Jazz to Come (Atlantic, 1959)
 Change of the Century (Atlantic, 1959)
 This Is Our Music (Atlantic, 1960)
 Free Jazz: A Collective Improvisation (Atlantic, 1961)
 The Empty Foxhole (Blue Note, 1966)
 Ornette at 12  (Impulse!, 1969)
 Crisis (Impulse!, 1969)
 Friends and Neighbors: Live at Prince Street (Flying Dutchman, 1970)
 The Art of the Improvisers (Atlantic, 1970) – rec. 1959–60
 Science Fiction (Columbia, 1971)
 Broken Shadows (Columbia, 1971)
 To Whom Who Keeps a Record (Atlantic, 1975) – rec. 1959–60
 In All Languages (Caravan of Dreams Productions, 1987)
 The Belgrade Concert (Jazz Door, 1995) – rec. 1971
 Live in Paris 1971 (Jazz Row, 2007) – rec. 1971

With Alice Coltrane
 Journey in Satchidananda (Impulse!, 1971) – 1 track "Isis and Osiris"
 John Coltrane: Infinity (Impulse!, 1972)
 Lord of Lords (Impulse!, 1972)
 Eternity (Warner, 1975)
 Translinear Light (Impulse!, 2004)
 Live at the Berkeley Community Theater 1972 (BCT, 2019) – rec. 1972

With Jim Hall
 Jim Hall & Basses (Telarc, 2001)
 Charlie Haden/Jim Hall (Impulse, 2014) – live rec. 1990 

With Joe Henderson
 The Elements (Milestone, 1974) – rec. 1973
 An Evening with Joe Henderson (Red, 1987) – live

With Keith Jarrett
 Life Between the Exit Signs (Vortex, 1968)
 Somewhere Before (Atlantic, 1968)
 The Mourning of a Star (Atlantic, 1971)
 Birth (Atlantic, 1972)
 El Juicio (The Judgement) (Atlantic, 1975)
 Expectations (Columbia, 1972)
 Hamburg '72 (ECM, 2014)
 Fort Yawuh (Impulse!, 1973)
 Treasure Island (Impulse!, 1974)
 Death and the Flower (Impulse!, 1975)
 Backhand (Impulse!, 1975)
 Arbour Zena (ECM, 1976)
 Mysteries (Impulse!, 1976)
 Shades (Impulse!, 1976)
 The Survivors' Suite (ECM, 1977)
 Eyes of the Heart (ECM, 1979)
 Byablue (Impulse!, 1977)
 Bop-Be (Impulse!, 1978)
 Jasmine (ECM, 2010)
 Last Dance (ECM, 2014)

With Lee Konitz and Brad Mehldau
 Alone Together (Blue Note, 1996)
 Another Shade of Blue (Blue Note, 1997)
 Live at Birdland with Paul Motian (ECM, 2009)

With Abbey Lincoln
 The World Is Falling Down (Verve, 1990)
 You Gotta Pay the Band (Verve, 1991)
 A Turtle's Dream (Verve, 1994)

With Pat Metheny
 80/81 (ECM, 1980)
 Rejoicing (ECM, 1984)
 Song X with Ornette Coleman (Geffen, 1986)
 Secret Story (Geffen, 1992)

With Paul Motian
 Conception Vessel (ECM, 1972)
 Tribute (ECM, 1974)
 On Broadway Volume 1 (JMT, 1988)
 On Broadway Volume 2 (JMT, 1989)
 On Broadway Volume 3 (JMT, 1991)

With Art Pepper
 Living Legend (Contemporary, 1975)
 So in Love (Artists House, 1979)
 Artworks (Galaxy, 1984) – rec. 1979
 Art 'n' Zoot with Zoot Sims (Pablo, 1995) – rec. 1981

With Enrico Pieranunzi
 Fellini Jazz (CAM Jazz, 2003)
 Special Encounter (CAM Jazz, 2005)

With Gonzalo Rubalcaba
 Discovery – Live at Montreux (Blue Note, 1990)
 The Blessing (Blue Note, 1991)
 Suite 4 Y 20 (Blue Note, 1992)
 Imagine (Blue Note, 1994)

With Roswell Rudd
 Everywhere (Impulse!, 1966)
 Numatik Swing Band (JCOA, 1973)

With John Scofield
 Time on My Hands (Blue Note, 1989)
 Grace Under Pressure (Blue Note, 1991)

With Denny Zeitlin
 Carnival (Columbia, 1964)
 Live at the Trident (Columbia, 1965)
 Zeitgeist (Columbia, 1967)
 Tidal Wave (Quicksilver, 1983)
 Time Remembers One Time Once (ECM, 1983)

With others
 Ray Anderson, Every One of Us (Gramavision, 1992)
 Gato Barbieri, The Third World (Flying Dutchman, 1970) – rec. 1969
 Kenny Barron, Wanton Spirit with Roy Haynes (Verve, 1994)
 Beck, Odelay (DGC, 1996)
 Jane Ira Bloom, Mighty Lights (Enja, 1982)
 Dušan Bogdanović, Early to Rise (Palo Alto, 1983)
 Charles Brackeen, Rhythm X (Strata-East, 1973)
 Gavin Bryars, Farewell to Philosophy (Point, 1995)
 Henry Butler, Fivin' Around (Impulse!, 1986)
 John Coltrane, The Avant-Garde with Don Cherry (Atlantic, 1960)
 James Cotton, Deep in the Blues (Verve, 1995)
 Robert Downey Jr., The Futurist (Sony, 2004)
 Dizzy Gillespie, Rhythmstick (CTI, 1990)
 Tom Harrell, Form (Contemporary, 1990)
 Fred Hersch, Sarabande (Sunnyside, 1986)
 Laurence Hobgood, When the Heart Dances (Naim Jazz, 2008)
 Mark Isham, Songs My Children Taught Me (Windham Hill, 1991)
 Rickie Lee Jones, Pop Pop (Geffen, 1991)
 David Liebman, Sweet Hands (Horizon, 1975)
 Joe Lovano, Universal Language (Blue Note, 1992)
 Michael Mantler, The Jazz Composer's Orchestra (JCOA, 1968)
 Adam Makowicz, Naughty Baby (RCA Novus, 1987)
 Harvey Mason, With All My Heart (RCA, 2004)
 John McLaughlin, My Goal's Beyond (Douglas, 1970)
 Mike Melvoin, The Capitol Sessions (Naim, 2000)
 Helen Merrill, You and the Night and the Music (Verve, 1998)
 Mingus Dynasty, Chair in the Sky (Elektra, 1980)
 Bheki Mseleku, Star Seeding (Polygram, 1995)
 Joe Pass, 12-string Guitar Movie Themes (World Pacific, 1964)
 Dewey Redman, Soundsigns (Galaxy, 1978)
 Joshua Redman, Wish (Warner, 1993)
 Pee Wee Russell and Henry "Red" Allen, The College Concert (Impulse!, 1966)
 Dino Saluzzi, Once Upon a Time – Far Away in the South (ECM, 1986) – rec. 1985
 David Sanborn, Another Hand (Elektra, 1991)
 Archie Shepp,  Mama Too Tight (Impulse!, 1967) – rec. 1966
 Alan Shorter, Orgasm (Verve, 1969) – rec. 1968
 Nana Simopoulos, Wings and Air (Enja, 1986)
 Wadada Leo Smith, Divine Love (ECM, 1979) – rec. 1978
 Ringo Starr, Ringo Rama (Koch, 2003) – rec. 2002
 Ringo Starr, Ringo 2012 (UMe, 2012)
 Masahiko Togashi, Session in Paris (Take One, 1979)
 Akiko Yano, Welcome Back (Midi, 1989)

References

Discographies of American artists
Jazz discographies